Khandapada (also spelt as Khandapara) is a town and a notified area committee in Nayagarh district in the Indian state of Odisha. It is located in the valley of nine mountains.

Geography

History

During the British Raj era, Khandapada was the capital of Khandpara State. It was one of several princely states of the Eastern States Agency. The instrument of accession to the Indian Union was signed by the last ruler of the state on 1 January 1948.
in the period of pathani samanta

Demographics
 India census, Khandapada had a population of 8754. Males constitute 52% of the population and females 48%. Khandapada has an average literacy rate of 75%, higher than the national average of 59.5%: male literacy is 82%, and female literacy is 67%. In Khandapada, 12% of the population is under 6 years of age.

Politics
Shri Soumya Ranjan Patnaik is a member of 16th Assembly of Odisha (2019 - 2024) elected from Khandapada assembly constituency.Previously Anubhav Patnaik son of late Arun Pattanaik who won the seat in the state election in 2014. MLA from Khandapada Assembly Constituency is BJD candidate Siddharth Singh, who won the seat in State elections in 2009. Bibhuti Bhushan Singh Mardaraj of INC won this seat in 1995, 1985 and also in 1980 as an independent candidate. Arun Kumar Pattanaik of JD won this seat in 1990 and Satyasundar Mishra won it in 1977 as independent candidate.

Khandapada is now part of Cuttack (Lok Sabha constituency).

Education 

·        Pathani Samanta (Degree) College, Khandapara

·        Women's (Degree) College, Khandapara

·        Nilamadhab (Degree) Mahavidyalaya, Kantilo

·        Prahallad (Degree) Mahavidyalaya, Padmavati

·        Balunkeswar Dev Anchalik (Degree) College, Bhapur

·        R.C HIGH SCHOOL, KHANDAPADA

·        GIRLS HIGH SCHOOL, KHANDAPADA

Khandapada Block Panchayat List

References

Cities and towns in Nayagarh district